Barium manganate is an inorganic compound with the formula BaMnO4.  It is used as an oxidant in organic chemistry. It belongs to a class of compounds known as manganates in which the manganese resides in a +6 oxidation state.  Manganate should not to be confused with permanganate which contains manganese(VII). Barium manganate is a powerful oxidant, popular in organic synthesis and can be used in a wide variety of oxidation reactions.

Properties
The manganate(VI) ion is a d1 ion and is tetrahedral with bond angles of approximately 109.5°. The Mn−O bond lengths in BaMnO4 and K2MnO4 are identical at 1.66 Å. Barium manganate is isomorphous with BaCrO4 and BaSO4. Barium manganate can appear as a dark blue or green to black crystals. Barium manganate is indefinitely stable, active and can be stored for months in dry conditions.

Preparation
Barium manganate can be prepared from potassium manganate and barium chloride by salt metathesis to give insoluble barium manganate:

Uses in organic synthesis
Barium manganate oxidizes a number of functional groups efficiently and selectively: alcohols to carbonyls, diols to lactones, thiols to disulfides, aromatic amines to azo-compounds, hydroquinone to p-benzoquinone,  benzylamine to benzaldehyde, hydrazones to diazo compounds,

etc.  It does not oxidize saturated hydrocarbons, alkenes, unsaturated ketones, and tertiary amines.  Barium manganate is a common substitute for MnO2. It is easier to prepare, reacts more efficiently, and the substrate:oxidant ratios are closer to theory.

Another use for barium manganate was as a pigment for making the artist’s color manganese blue. It is no longer used for that purpose; instead, paint manufacturers substitute a synthetic manganese blue hue.

References

Manganates
Barium compounds
Oxidizing agents